These Times is an album by Mike Stern, released in 2004 through ESC Records. The album reached a peak position of number eleven on Billboard Top Jazz Albums chart.

Track listing

Personnel
Mike Stern - guitar
Jim Beard - producer, piano, synthesizer
Jon Herington - guitar (track: 10)
Béla Fleck - banjo (track: 3)
Kenny Garrett - soprano saxophone (track: 1), alto saxophone (tracks: 7, 9)
Bob Franceschini - tenor saxophone (tracks: 4, 8, 11)
Bob Malach - tenor saxophone (track: 6)
Will Lee - bass (tracks: 1, 4, 6, 7, 9)
Richard Bona - bass (tracks: 2, 3, 5, 10), percussion (tracks: 2, 10), vocals (tracks: 2, 3, 5, 10)
Victor Wooten - bass (tracks: 8, 11)
Vinnie Colaiuta - drums (tracks: 1 to 7, 9 to 11)
Dennis Chambers - drums (track: 8)
Arto Tuncboyaciyan - percussion (tracks: 1, 4, 5, 6, 9)
Don Alias - percussion (tracks: 8, 10)
Elisabeth Kontomanou - vocals (tracks: 1, 2, 4, 6)

References

2004 albums
Mike Stern albums